John I, Duke of Cleves, Count of Mark (16 February 1419 – 5 September 1481). Jean de Belliqueux (warlike), was Duke of Cleves and Count of Mark.

Life 

John was the son of Adolph I, Duke of Cleves and Mary of Burgundy. He was raised in Brussels at the Burgundian court of his uncle Philip the Good. He ruled Cleves from 1448 from 1481, and Mark since 1461 after the death of his uncle Gerhard who had waged war on his own brother.

John fought 3 wars with the Electorate of Cologne and finally defeated Ruprecht of the Palatinate, conquering the cities of Xanten and Soest. In these wars, he was supported by his uncle Philip the Good, bringing Cleves-Mark into the Burgundian sphere of influence. His marriage with Elisabeth Countess of Nevers, from a sideline of the House of Burgundy, only strengthened this influence. John also took sides in the Münster Diocesan Feud supporting the aspirations of the House of Hoya to the episcopacy in Münster.

John was also made a Knight in the Burgundian Order of the Golden Fleece in 1451, with which he was depicted by Rogier van der Weyden. In 1473 he helped the Burgundian Duke Charles the Bold conquer the Duchy of Guelders.

Marriage and children 
On 22 April 1455, John married Elizabeth of Nevers, daughter of John II, Count of Nevers.
They had:
 John II, Duke of Cleves (13 April 1458 – 15 March 1521); married 3 November 1489 Matilda of Hesse
 Adolf (1461–1498); a canon of Liege
 Engelbert, Count of Nevers (26 September 1462 – 21 November 1506); married 23 February 1489 Charlotte de Bourbon-Vendôme
 Dietrich (1464)
 Marie of Cleves (1465–1513)
 Philip of Cleves (1467–1505); Bishop of Nevers, Amiens and Autun

Ancestors

References

Sources

External links
 Stirnet.com Accessed July 29, 2007
 

1419 births
1481 deaths
Counts of the Mark
Dukes of Cleves
Knights of the Golden Fleece